Eugen Zardetti (27 November 1849, Rorschach - 21 February 1926, Lucerne) was a Swiss portrait and marine painter. He was also an early automobile owner.

Biography
His father, Eugen, and mother Annette (née Von Bayer) were from an upper-class family that dealt in various colonial goods. He graduated from the Stella Matutina in Vorarlberg. Having displayed an early aptitude for art, he studied at the University of Innsbruck for a time, then switched to the Polytechnikum in Zürich where he studied with the architect Gottfried Semper. After stays in Geneva and Lucerne, he attended the Academy of Fine Arts, Karlsruhe. His artistic education was completed with study trips to Paris, Italy, and along the east coast of Africa.

After 1885, he was able to purchase a small mansion, the "Villa Mirador", in Bregenz (now a residence for a local gymnasium) and decided to specialize in marine painting. His best known work is, perhaps, a monumental panorama of the Battle of Lepanto.

From 1914, after the beginning of World War I, he lived in Lucerne. 

He was also interested in technology and was the owner of the first industrially-produced automobile in Austria; a three-wheeled Benz Patent-Motorwagen. In 1898, he had it rebuilt as a four-wheeler. After his death, it was acquired by the Vienna Technical Museum where it still remains. Until 1896, Zardetti was the only automobile owner in Vorarlberg.

His older brother, Otto Zardetti, served as the Archbishop of Bucharest. One of his nieces was the author , who owned the first steam yacht on Lake Constance.

References

Further reading 
 Emmerich Gmeiner, Eugen Zardetti und die Auto-Vorarlberger. Eine Geschichte des frühen Automobilismus im Ländle, Hecht-Druck 2007,

External links 

1849 births
1926 deaths
Swiss painters
Marine art
People from Rorschach, Switzerland